Greek art began in the Cycladic and Minoan civilization, and gave birth to Western classical art in the subsequent Geometric, Archaic and Classical periods (with further developments during the Hellenistic Period). It absorbed influences of Eastern civilizations, of Roman art and its patrons, and the new religion of Orthodox Christianity in the Byzantine era and absorbed Italian and European ideas during the period of Romanticism (with the invigoration of the Greek Revolution), until the Modernist and Postmodernist.  
Greek art is mainly five forms: architecture, sculpture, painting, pottery and jewelry making.

Ancient period 

Artistic production in Greece began in the prehistoric pre-Greek Cycladic and the Minoan civilizations, both of which were influenced by local traditions and the art of ancient Egypt.

There are three scholarly divisions of the stages of later ancient Greek art that correspond roughly with historical periods of the same names. These are the Archaic, the Classical and the Hellenistic. The Archaic period is usually dated from 1000 BC. The Persian Wars of 480 BC to 448 BC are usually taken as the dividing line between the Archaic and the Classical periods, and the death of Alexander the Great in 323 BC is regarded as the event separating the Classical from the Hellenistic period. Of course, different forms of art developed at different speeds in different parts of the Greek world, and varied to a degree from artist to artist.  There was a sharp transition from one period to another.

The art of ancient Greece has exercised an enormous influence on the culture of many countries from ancient times until the present, particularly in the areas of sculpture and architecture. In the West, the art of the Roman Empire was largely derived from Greek models. In the East, Alexander the Great's conquests initiated several centuries of exchange between Greek, Central Asian and Indian cultures, resulting in Greco-Buddhist art, with ramifications as far as Japan. Following the Renaissance in Europe, the humanist aesthetic and the high technical standards of Greek art inspired generations of European artists. Pottery was either blue with black designs or black with blue designs.

Byzantine period 

Byzantine art is the term created for the Eastern Roman Empire from about the 5th century until the fall of Constantinople in 1453. (The Roman Empire during this period is conventionally known as the Byzantine Empire.)
The term can also be used for the art of states which were contemporary with the Byzantine Empire and shared a common culture with it, without actually being part of it, such as Bulgaria, or Russia, and also Venice, which had close ties to the Byzantine Empire despite being in other respects part of western European culture. It can also be used for the art of people of the former Byzantine Empire under the rule of Ottoman Empire after 1453. In some respects, the Byzantine artistic tradition has continued in Russia and other Eastern Orthodox countries to the present day.

Byzantine art grew from the art of ancient Greece and, at least before 1453, never lost sight of its classical heritage, but was distinguished from it in a number of ways. The most profound of these was that the humanist ethic of ancient Greek art was replaced by the Christian ethic. If the purpose of classical art was the glorification of man, the purpose of Byzantine art was the glorification of God.

In place of the nude, the figures of God the Father, Jesus Christ, the Virgin Mary and the saints and martyrs of Christian tradition were elevated and became the dominant - indeed almost exclusive - focus of Byzantine art. One of the most important forms of Byzantine art was, and still is, the Cretan school as the leading school of Greek post-Byzantine painting after Crete fell to the Ottomans in 1669. Like the Cretan school, it combined Byzantine traditions with an increasing Western European artistic influence, and also saw the first signiand the National Gallery of Art in Washington, D.C.

Post-Byzantine and modern period 

Cretan School describes the school of icon painting, also known as Post-Byzantine art, which flourished while Crete was under Venetian rule during the late Middle Ages, reaching its climax after the Fall of Constantinople, becoming the central force in Greek painting during the 15th, 16th and 17th centuries. The Cretan artists developed a particular style of painting under the influence of both Eastern and Western artistic traditions and movements; the most famous product of the school, El Greco, was the most successful of the many artists who tried to build a career in Western Europe, and also the one who left the Byzantine style farthest behind him in his later career.

The Heptanese School of painting (also known as the Ionian Islands' School) succeeded the Cretan School as the leading school of Greek post-Byzantine painting after Crete fell to the Ottomans in 1669. Like the Cretan school it combined Byzantine traditions with an increasing Western European artistic influence, and also saw the first significant depiction of secular subjects. The school was based in the Ionian Islands, which were not part of Ottoman Greece, from the middle of the 17th century until the middle of the 19th century.

Modern Greek art, after the establishment of the Greek Kingdom, began to be developed around the time of Romanticism. Greek artists absorbed many elements from their European colleagues, resulting in the culmination of the distinctive style of Greek Romantic art, inspired by revolutionary ideals as well as the country's geography and history. After centuries of Ottoman rule, few opportunities for an education in the arts existed in the newly independent Greece, so studying abroad was imperative for artists. Munich, as an important international center for the arts at that time, was the place where the majority of the Greek artists of the 19th century chose to study. Later on, they would return to Greece and pass on their knowledge. Both academic and personal bonds developed between early Greek painters and Munich artistry giving birth to the Greek "Munich School" (Greek academic art of the 19th century). Nikolaos Gysis was an important teacher and artist at the Munich Academy and he soon became a leading figure among Greek artists.  Many of these Munich School artists chose subjects such as everyday Greek life, local customs, and living conditions. Several important painters emerged at this time. Theodoros Vryzakis specialized in historical painting and especially inspired by the 1821 Greek War of Independence. Nikiphoros Lytras concentrated on realistic depictions of Greek life. Georgios Jakobides devoted his attention to infants and children and he would laterbecome the first Director of the new National Gallery of Athens. Georgios Roilos was another leading painter of the period closely associated with the Munich School, especially in his early career. Konstantinos Volanakis was inspired mostly by the Greek sea.

Other notable painters of the era are Theodore Ralli, Ioannis Altamouras and the folk painter Theofilos Hatzimichail. Notable sculptors of the era are Leonidas Drosis (his major work was the extensive neo-classical architectural ornament at the Academy of Athens, Lazaros Sochos, Georgios Vitalis, Dimitrios Filippotis, Ioannis Kossos, Yannoulis Chalepas, Georgios Bonanos and Lazaros Fytalis.

Major museums and galleries in Greece

Attica 
 Acropolis Museum
 National Archaeological Museum, Athens
 National Gallery (Athens)
 Byzantine and Christian Museum
 National Museum of Contemporary Art, Athens
 Benaki Museum
 Goulandris Museum of Cycladic Art
 Stoa of Attalos
 Numismatic Museum of Athens
 Archaeological Museum of Piraeus

Thessaloniki 
 Archaeological Museum of Thessaloniki
 Museum of Byzantine Culture

Crete 
 Heraklion Archaeological Museum
 Archaeological Museum of Chania
 Agia Triada Monastery

Corfu 
 Archaeological Museum of Corfu
 Byzantine Museum of Antivouniotissa

Rest of Greece 
 Archaeological Museum of Patras
 Archaeological Museum of Volos
 Archaeological Museum of Dion
 Archaeological Museum of Amphipolis
 Archaeological Museum of Pella
 Archaeological Museum of Veroia
 Archaeological Museum of Thasos
 Archaeological Museum of Delos
 Archaeological Museum of Rhodes
 Archaeological Museum of Epidaurus
 Archaeological Museum of Olympia
 Delphi Archaeological Museum
 Nea Moni of Chios
 Florina Museum of Modern Art

See also 
 History of Greece
 Culture of Greece
 Modern Greek art
 Byzantine and Christian Museum

References

External links 

 Ancient Greece website
 Art History Resources on the Web: Greek Art
 A History of Greek Art by Frank Bigelow Tarbell
 A History Of Greek Art by F. B. Tarbell
 Byzantine Art Charles Diehl
 National Gallery of Athens
 Modern Greek Painters

 
 
Art by country